Rachel Valerie Hawkins (born 31 January 1992) is a Scottish former cricketer who played as an all-rounder, batting right-handed and bowling right-arm medium. She played for Scotland between 2012 and 2019, including appearing in 16 Twenty20 Internationals in 2018 and 2019. She played domestic cricket for Nottinghamshire.

International career
Hawkins played in the 2017 Women's Cricket World Cup Qualifier in February 2017. In June 2018, she was named in Scotland's squad for the 2018 ICC Women's World Twenty20 Qualifier tournament. She made her Women's Twenty20 International (WT20I) for Scotland against Uganda in the World Twenty20 Qualifier on 7 July 2018, where she was named the player of the match. She was the leading wicket-taker for Scotland in the tournament, with eight dismissals in five matches.

In May 2019, she was named in Scotland's squad for the 2019 ICC Women's Qualifier Europe tournament in Spain. In August 2019, she was named in Scotland's squad for the 2019 ICC Women's World Twenty20 Qualifier tournament in Scotland.

In September 2020, Hawkins announced her retirement from cricket.

References

External links
 
 

1992 births
Living people
Cricketers from Manchester
Scottish women cricketers
Scotland women Twenty20 International cricketers
Nottinghamshire women cricketers